Guri i Kuq ( or Guri i Verdhë; , Žuti kamen, translated as "yellow rock") is a mountain in the Prokletije in Kosovo. North of the mountain is the Rugova Canyon. The Kopranik mountain are located just east of Žuti kamen. There is a lake near the summit of the mountain, the Guri i Kuq Lake.

Notes

References 

Mountains of Kosovo
Accursed Mountains
Two-thousanders of Kosovo